The 2011–12 Citizen AA season involves Citizen competing in the First Division League, Senior Shield, FA Cup, League Cup and AFC Cup. Citizen qualified for the AFC Cup after winning the 2010–11 Senior Shield.

Players

Competitions

First Division League

Senior Shield

Quarter-finals

FA Cup

League Cup

AFC Cup

References

Citizen
Citizen AA seasons